(Walter) William Fell (1761/2 – 27 March 1848, Shap) was an English writer.

Life
William Fell was probably born near Brampton, Cumberland. He was a schoolmaster successively at Manchester, Wilmslow, and Lancaster, and was an industrious writer for the press. After his retirement he lived at Clifton, near Lowther, Westmorland. He died in March 1848 at Shap, aged 86, predeceased by his wife Dorothy and son Edward. He left his substantial property to the children of his elder brother, John Fell of Swindale Head, thereby disinheriting his only surviving son, Henry, who lived in Denmark.

Works
 Hints on the Instruction of Youth (anonymous), Manchester, 1798
 Hints on the Causes of the High Prices of Provisions, Penrith, 1800
 A System of Political Economy, Salford, 1808
 Remarks on Mr. Lancaster's System of Education, in which his erroneous statements and the defects in his mode of tuition are detected and explained, Warrington, 1811
 A Sketch of the Principal Events in English History, Warrington, 1811; 2nd edition 1813

References

1758 births
1848 deaths
18th-century English people
18th-century English non-fiction writers
18th-century English male writers
19th-century English non-fiction writers
People from Brampton, Carlisle
English non-fiction writers
English male non-fiction writers
19th-century English male writers
Schoolteachers from Cumbria
People from Clifton, Cumbria